Goat Haunt Lake is located in Glacier National Park, in the U. S. state of Montana. Goat Haunt Mountain is southeast of the lake.

See also
List of lakes in Glacier County, Montana

References

Lakes of Glacier National Park (U.S.)
Lakes of Glacier County, Montana